Émerson Carlos Cesário, also known as Émerson (born 16 February 1990) is a football player.

International career
Émerson was born at Campo Mourão, Brazil, and is the current main goalkeeper for the Timor-Leste national football team, after having been naturalized in the Portuguese-speaking Southeast Asian country, together with other Brazilian players. He made his senior international debut against Cambodia in the 2012 AFF Suzuki Cup qualification on 5 October 2012.

Émerson played his best at third match of 2011 SEA Games against Vietnam  event-though his team loss.

References

External links
http://apps.seag2011.com/rs2011/bm/fb/playername.aspx?gid=M&CID=10&MatchID=522&sname=Football&gametype=L

1990 births
Living people
Sportspeople from Paraná (state)
East Timorese footballers
Timor-Leste international footballers
Association football forwards
Goiânia Esporte Clube players
Brazilian footballers
Brazilian expatriate footballers
Expatriate footballers in Thailand
East Timorese expatriate footballers

Association football goalkeepers